Craugastor saltuarius is a species of frog in the family Craugastoridae.
It is endemic to Honduras.
Its natural habitat is subtropical or tropical moist montane forests.
It is threatened by habitat loss.

References

saltuarius
Endemic fauna of Honduras
Amphibians of Honduras
Frogs of North America
Critically endangered fauna of North America
Amphibians described in 1997
Taxonomy articles created by Polbot